Stemodia durantifolia is a species of flowering plant in the plantain family commonly known as the whitewoolly twintip and purple stemodia. Stemodia durantifolia is native to the Americas, including Chile, Mexico, Texas, and the deserts of California and Arizona, and is often found in riparian habitats, preferring wet sand and rocks. The inflorescence is a raceme of violet flowers, with each corolla held in a calyx of hairy, pointed sepals, and can often be found in bloom year-round. Although globally at low risk of extinction, Stemodia durantifolia is imperiled in California due to its rarity and threats from development.

Description

Characteristics 
The branching habit is both basal and axillary. The leaves are lanceolate and subsessile, and toothed along their edges. The terminal inflorescence is an ascending, spike-like structure. The bracts are equal to or slightly longer in length to the flowers or more or less equal to the length of the sepals. The flowers have a violet corolla. The sepals measure equal to or longer than half of the length of the corolla.

These characteristics differentiate it from other Stemodia species in its range.

Stemodia durantifolia flowers all year.

Morphology 
The herbage is glandular- or eglandular-hairy, with crinkly hairs in the variety chilensis. The leaves are arranged opposite or verticillate, with the variety chilensis possessing more verticillate leaves than the typical variety. The larger leaves and subsessile and clasping. The leaf margins are serrate distally.

The inflorescences are ascending, upper flowering stems are spiciform (spike-like), with the leaves becoming reduced bracts. The calyx is split into 5 sepals, usually equal in size or with the posterior one sometimes longer. The corolla is two-lipped, with the upper lobe suberect and the lower lip 3-lobed.

Taxonomy

Subspecies 

 Stemodia durantifolia (L.) Sw. var. durantifolia — The autonymic variety.
 Stemodia durantifolia (L.) Sw. var. chilensis C. Cowan — Commonly known as the Chilean stemodia. Found in Chile and parts of Argentina.

Distribution and habitat

Distribution 

Stemodia durantifolia is native to the Americas, and is found in a wide distribution spanning from the southwestern United States to Chile.

In the United States, Stemodia durantifolia is found in California, Arizona, and Texas, with introduced populations in Florida. This species is uncommon in California and is found rarely in San Diego County and in the canyons near Palm Springs in Riverside County. In Arizona, this species is found in Gila, Maricopa, Pinal, and Pima counties.

In Mexico, Stemodia durantifolia is found in 29 states in the country, ranging from Baja California to Tamaulipas to Quintana Roo. On the Baja California Peninsula, which includes the states of Baja California and Baja California Sur, this species is found sparsely from canyons in the eastern Sierra de Juarez to more commonly in wetlands from the Sierra de la Libertad to the Cape of the peninsula.

In Chile and Argentina, the variety Stemodia durantifolia var. chilensis is found, with the typical variety absent. In Chile, this species is found in the north, central, and southern parts of the country, from Atacama Region to Araucania Region. In Argentina, this species is found in the province of Rio Negro and possibly in Patagonia. Previous identifications in Argentina of S. durantifolia var. durantifolia, the typical species, are presumed to be misidentifications of Stemodia stricta, Stemodia lanceolata, and Stemodia hyptoides.

Habitat 
Stemodia durantifolia is usually found in wet and riparian places, sometimes disturbed, including along stream banks, ditches, margins of pools, rocks, and seepy hillsides. For substrate, it prefers wet sand and rock. Plants are usually found below .

References

External links
Jepson Manual Treatment
Photo gallery

Plantaginaceae
Taxa named by Carl Linnaeus
Flora of the Southwestern United States
Flora of Texas
Flora of Florida
Flora of Mexico
Flora of Central America
Flora of the Caribbean
Flora of South America
Natural history of the California chaparral and woodlands
Natural history of the Peninsular Ranges
Taxa named by Olof Swartz